Operation Quds-2 is one of the operations of the Iran–Iraq War, which was launched on July 25, 1985 in the "Hor al-Hawizeh" (Hawizeh Marshes) operational zone by the forces of the Islamic Revolutionary Guard Corps (of Islamic Republic of Iran).

The military code of the operation Quds-2 was "Ya Muhammad Rasoolullah (PBUH)" and its goals was in order to neutralize the counterattack of the Ba'athist forces of the Iraqi army around the area of "Al-Bayda".

At the operation Quds-2 which was considered as an amphibious military operation, Islamic Revolutionary Guard Corps killed 312 Iraqi forces, and at the end of the operation liberated 15 square kilometers of the northern zone of Hur al-Hawizeh as well as destroying 30 boats and 15 water police-posts of Ba'athist forces of Saddam.

See also
 Operation Quds-1

References

History of Khuzestan Province
Battles involving Iran
Battles involving Iraq
Military operations of the Iran–Iraq War